As one of the best known and well-travelled persons of the 20th century, there are many cultural references to Pope John Paul II (18 May 1920 – 2 April 2005), who reigned as the 264th Pope of the Roman Catholic Church and Sovereign of the State of the Vatican City from 16 October 1978, until his death in April 2005, making his the second-longest pontificate after Pius IX's 31-year reign. In addition to his own extensive writings, many films, television programs, books, and journal articles have been written about John Paul II.

Films
Films made about John Paul II include:
 Pope John Paul II (1984 film), directed by Herbert Wise, starring Albert Finney, Nigel Hawthorne, Alfred Burke, John McEnery, Patrick Stewart. The film debuted on CBS Television on Easter Sunday, 22 April 1984.
 Pope John Paul's Third Pilgrimage to His Homeland, a documentary on John Paul's June 1987 visit to Poland.
  (1981), directed by Krzysztof Zanussi.
 The Millennial Pope: John Paul II (1999) (TV), a documentary directed by Helen Whitney.
 The Papal Chase (2004), a documentary by Kenny Hotz.

 Karol: A Man Who Became Pope, Polish title: Karol. Czlowiek, który zostal papiezem, 2005, a documentary, directed by Giacomo Battiato, based upon the book Stories of Karol: The Unknown Life of John Paul II by Gian Franco Svidercoschi.
 Have No Fear: The Life of Pope John Paul II (2005), a movie based on the life of Pope John Paul, shot on location in Rome and Lithuania, was broadcast on Thursday, 1 December 2005 (8:00–10:00 pm. ET/PT).
 Pope John Paul II (2005), a four-hour mini-series event based on the remarkable life of Pope John Paul II, shot on location in Kraków, Poland and in Italy, was broadcast Sunday, 4 December (9:00–11:00 pm, ET/PT) and Wednesday, 7 December (8:00–10:00 pm, ET/PT) on the CBS Television Network. Cary Elwes portrays Karol Wojtyla in his adult years prior to being elected Pope on 16 October 1978, and Academy Award winner and multiple Golden Globe Award winner Jon Voight portrays him during his extraordinary 26 1/2-year reign that ended with his death on 2 April 2005. It was approved and blessed by Pope Benedict XVI.
 A Time Remembered – The Visit of Pope John Paul II to Ireland (2005), a film produced by Radio Telefís Éireann, the national broadcaster of Ireland, showing footage from the three-day visit in 1979.
 Karol: The Pope, The Man world debut was on Easter Sunday and Monday of 2006, and is the continuation of Karol: A Man Who Became Pope. It stars the same actors as the first mini-series.
 Credo: John Paul II a film containing highlights of John Paul II's pontificate, his spiritual heritage, his most significant meetings with heads of states, but also his contact with people from all over the world, from the day of his election to his funeral, with music by Andrea Bocelli.
 The Life of Pope John Paul II, a 4 chapter series by NBC News
 John Paul II – The Friend of All Humanity 60-minute cartoon available on multilingual DVD by Cavin Cooper Productions
 John Paul II, the Pope who made History – 5 DVD by Vatican Television Center (distr. by HDH Communications)
 John Paul II, this is my story – 1 DVD by Vatican Television Center (distr. by HDH Communications)
 John Paul II the Keys of the Kingdom – 1 DVD by Vatican Television Center (distr. by HDH Communications)
 The Pope's Toilet, a Uruguayan film located in Melo.
 In 1984, Pope John Paul made a cameo appearance on the Malayalam film Minimol Vathicanil. While child actor Shalini's character is visiting Rome, John Paul is seen taking her from the crowd and kissing her. The clip was included in the film.

Animation
 John Paul II is the only Pope who appears as a main character in an animated feature.

Books by and about John Paul II

 For a comprehensive list of books written by and about John Paul II, please see Bibliography of Pope John Paul II

Literary references
 The action-thriller novel, Red Rabbit (2002) by Tom Clancy, detailed a fictional KGB attempt to assassinate a newly elected Polish Pope, who, though only mentioned by the name "Karol", is obviously supposed to be John Paul II.
 Pope John Paul II's visit to Cuba in 1998, the first one ever made by a Pope to this Caribbean island, was featured in Daína Chaviano's novel The Island of Eternal Love (Riverhead, 2008).

Comics references
 A comic book biography of Pope John Paul II titled The Life of Pope John Paul II was published by Marvel Comics in January 1983. It was illustrated by John Tartaglione. NBM Publishing released a comics biography of the pope in October 2006.  
 Pope John Paul II was a minor character in the comic book series Warrior Nun Areala. He was often just called "the Pope" but displays of his personal coat of arms—see here—confirm that the unnamed pontiff was indeed supposed to be John Paul. Sister Areala even met him and called him by name at the climax of Warrior Nun Areala/Scorpio Rose No. 4.
 Pope John Paul II is featured briefly in the satirical comic book album Pest In 't Paleis (1983) by Guido van Meir and Jan Bosschaert. 
 Belgian cartoonist Zak and writer Bert Verhoye featured Pope John Paul II in a satirical comic album named De Vliegende Paap (1985).
 Belgian comics artist Luk Moerman drew the satirical comic book album De Papevreters – Popebusters (1985), which satirized John Paul II's visit to Belgium that same year.
 French comics artist Guy Lehideux once made a biographical comic book about Pope John Paul II.
 French comics artist Jean Lucas once featured John Paul II in a cameo in his album Le Secret de la Lune au Temple du Soleil.

Music
 Comedy musician Snuky Tate (real name Lionel White) recorded the novelty song He's the Groove (1980) about the Pope. It was recorded to coincide with the papal visit to the United States in 1980. 
 The pope is one of several celebrity politicians seen in Killing Joke's music video to their song "Eighties", which also features Ronald Reagan, Margaret Thatcher, Leonid Brezhnev, Anwar Sadat, Ruhollah Khomeini, Konstantin Chernenko and John DeLorean.
 In 1987 Holger Czukay samples the papal Easter message in his song Blessed Easter. The music video of the song featured the musician in trick footage with Pope John Paul II. 
 Sarah Vaughan's musical album The Planet Is Alive...Let It Live! is set to poetry written by Pope John Paul II, but in English translation. 
 On 23 March 1999, John Paul II released his debut CD Abbà Pater.
 John Paul II has been featured on at least seven popular albums in his native Poland. Most notably singer-songwriter Stanisław Sojka's 2003 album, "Jan Pawel II – Tryptyk Rzymski", a ten-track collection of the Pope's poems set to music, reached No. 1.
 John Paul II is referred to in the song "Never Let Me Down" by Kanye West and Jay-Z on the album The College Dropout.

Television
 Like many celebrities of the 1980s and 1990s Pope John Paul II was featured in the satirical puppet TV series Spitting Image. In parody of his frequent world tours he was depicted as a rock 'n' roll star with an American accent.
 In an episode of The Golden Girls, the Pope makes a brief stopover in Miami and Sophia Petrillo wants him to bless a sick friend of hers. This drives her to steal his ring after the papal Mass.
 In 1986, Pope John Paul made a cameo appearance on the television soap Brookside.  While Bobby and Sheila Grant were visiting Rome, John Paul made an appearance at a window for the crowd, clearly being seen in the finished production.
 Pope John Paul II appears in the South Park episode Red Hot Catholic Love.
 Pope John Paul II appears in the 1995 Picket Fences episode Witness the Prosecution.
 A caricature of Pope John Paul II appears in the Freakazoid! episodes "Mo-Ron/Sewer Rescue/The Big Question/Legends Who Lunch", "The Freakazoid", and "Nerdator".

Video games
 Pope John Paul II is one of five world leaders to be featured in the video game Spitting Image.

Miscellaneous references
 John Paul II's apostolic motto was Totus Tuus ("totally yours"); and according to his Rosarium Virginis Mariae he borrowed the motto from the Marian consecrating prayer as found in "True Devotion to Mary" by Saint Louis Marie Grignion de Montfort. The complete text of the prayer in Latin is: "Tuus totus ego sum, et omnia mea tua sunt" ("I am all Yours, and all that I have belongs to You"). Furthermore, he singled out Saint Louis de Montfort as a key example of Marian spirituality in his Redemptoris Mater encyclical, and in an address to the Montfortian Fathers said that reading one of de Montfort's books had been a "decisive turning point" in his life.
 John Paul II was the only Pope of the twentieth century to have a letter (the letter 'M' for Mary in a Marian Cross) in his coat of arms. [Pius VII] (1800–1823) also had letters in his coat of arms, forming the word PAX (peace).
 A new form of the Stations of the Cross, called the Scriptural Way of the Cross which calls for more meditation, was introduced by Pope John Paul II on Good Friday 1991. He celebrated that thereafter at the Colosseum.
 The Pope was named Time magazine's Person of the year in 1994.
 According to a New York Post article of 19 February 2002, John Paul II personally performed three exorcisms during his tenure as pope. The first exorcism was performed on a woman in 1982. His second was in September 2000 when he performed the rite on a 19-year-old woman who had become enraged in St Peter's Square. A year later, in September 2001, he performed an exorcism on a 20-year-old woman.
 The John Paul II International Airport (IATA: KRK), in Balice, Poland, near Kraków where he served as Archbishop before being elected Pope, was named in his honor.
 In 2004 he received an extraordinary Charlemagne Award of the city of Aachen, Germany.
 The Harlem Globetrotters visited Pope John Paul II at the Vatican in November 2000 and named the Pontiff an Honorary Harlem Globetrotter.
 In 2003, his death was incorrectly announced by CNN when his pre-written obituary (along with those of several other famous figures) was inadvertently published on CNN's web site due to a lapse in password protection.
 In 2004 John Paul II met members of the Poland national football team. It was at this time he told Liverpool Goalkeeper Jerzy Dudek that he was a keen fan of his and followed Liverpool whenever they played. Dudek, who had the honour of presenting the Pope with a souvenir goalkeeper shirt, would later dedicate Liverpool's Champions League success to the late pontiff.
 John Paul II is considered as the "protector" of Fluminense Football Club among supporters of this traditional Brazilian football team. One of the team's most famous chants is "A Bênção, João de Deus" ("Bless us, John of God"), a song that was composed in honour of the Pope John Paul II on his first visit to Brazil in 1980. The tradition is that Fluminense fans spontaneously started singing the famous song when the team was to decide the 1980 state championship on a penalty shootout against their arch-rivals Vasco da Gama. Fluminense won the championship.
 John Paul II is the eighth most admired person by U.S. citizens in the 20th century, according to Gallup.
 John Paul II was an avid football player in his youth and later became an honorary member of FC Barcelona, BV Borussia Dortmund, and Schalke 04. He was a goalkeeper.
 His favorite football team had always been Cracovia, whose games he attended while living in Kraków.
 In 2006 a white hybrid tea rose was named "Pope John Paul II" in his honour, with a percentage of sales going to charity.  Ten of the rose bushes were planted in the Vatican gardens.
 Polish Formula 1 driver Robert Kubica drives in a helmet with the "Jan Pawel II" inscription.
 John Paul II sent the first papal e-mail in 2001.
 Solar eclipses took place both on the day he was born and the day of his funeral 9:22 pm.
 In 2004, Ferrari made a special F1 car for the pope to celebrate his 26th anniversary as the pontiff.
 John Paul II, when meeting Bono and Bob Geldof during their visit famously asked to try on Bono's trademark fly sunglasses.
 In 1988, when the Pope delivered a speech to the European Parliament, the leader of the Democratic Unionist Party, Ian Paisley, shouted "I denounce you as the antichrist!" and held up a poster reading "POPE JOHN PAUL II ANTICHRIST". The Pope continued with his address after Paisley was ejected from the auditorium, primarily by then 77-year-old Otto von Habsburg, former crown prince of Austria-Hungary and a well-known and devout Catholic, with Habsburg snatching Paisley's banner, punching him in the face and, along with other MEPs, pushing him out of the chamber.
 A popular story in chess circles states that a certain Karol Wojtyla had published a chess problem in 1946. Although the young Wojtyla was indeed an accomplished chess player, the story of this publication appears to be a hoax whose roots were uncovered by Tomasz Lissowski.
 John Paul McQueen is named after the pope in the fictional soap Hollyoaks; they also share the same birthday.

References